The Bold Ones: The Lawyers (or The Lawyers) is an American legal drama that aired for three seasons on NBC from September 1968 through February 1972.

Synopsis
The series starred Burl Ives as Walter Nichols, a respected attorney who hires two brothers (Joseph Campanella and James Farentino) who are lawyers to help him with his case load.

The Lawyers was part of The Bold Ones, a rotating series of dramas that also included The New Doctors (with E.G. Marshall), The Protectors (with Leslie Nielsen) and The Senator (with Hal Holbrook). It was nominated for three Emmy awards and won two of them.
Pat Hingle and Walter Brooke each made two guest appearances, and had previously appeared in The New Doctors. Kermit Murdock also made two guest appearances, and later appeared in cameo roles in The Senator.

During the production of the first series of 8 episodes, James Farentino complained vociferously to the producers about the scripts and was suspended for three weeks, missing two shows. Later, near the end of the third series, he announced he was leaving of his own volition, but the series was not renewed for a fourth year.

Cast

Main cast
 Burl Ives as  Walter Nichols an attorney that hires the Darrel brothers to help him with his cases. (appeared in 26 episodes and both films)
 Joseph Campanella as Brian Darrell, one of the two Darrel Brothers who helps Nicholas with his cases. (appeared in 24 episodes and the second film)
 James Farentino as Neil Darrell, the other one of the two Darrel Brothers. (appeared in 19 episodes and both films)

Recurring characters
 John Milford as Lieutenant Paul Hewitt (appeared in 6 episodes)
 Todd Martin as Deputy District Attorney Skinner (appeared in 3 episodes)

Guest stars
 Charles Aidman made three appearances including "The Rockford Riddle" and "The Search for Leslie Grey"
 Patricia Barry made two appearances playing different roles
 Ramon Bieri made two appearances as Judge Hartman
 Walter Brooke made two appearances as Dr. Howe including "By Reason of Insanity"
 Frank Campanella made two appearances
 Bob Corff made two appearances as Brother Bartholomew
 Roger Davis made three appearances including "The Long Morning After: Pt. 1 and Pt. 2"
 Pete Duel made an appearance in "Trial of a Pfc"
 Dana Elcar made two appearances as District Attorney Shannon including "The Crowd Pleasers"
 Will Geer made three appearances including "The Verdict"
 Clarke Gordon made two appearances
 Anne Helm made two appearances
 Pat Hingle made two appearances as General Sternwood
 Charles Lampkin made two appearances
 Randolph Mantooth made an appearance as Terry Kimble in "The Strange Secret of Yermo Hill" 
 Jared Martin made two appearances including "Trial of a Pfc"
 Pamela McMyler made two appearances as  Linda Sternwood
 George Murdock made two appearances as District Attorney Braddock
 Kermit Murdock made two appearances as Judge Chapman including "Justice is a Sometime Thing"
 Herbert Nelson made two appearances
 Leslie Perkins made two appearances
 John S. Ragin made two appearances
 Ford Rainey made two appearances
 John Randolph made two appearances as Dr. Paul Schaefer
 Nina Shipman made two appearances as Louise Miller
 David Spielberg made three appearances as Vernon Wahlburg
 Mel Tormé made an appearance as Harry Carter in "The Crowd Pleaser"
 Richard Van Vleet made two appearances as  James Fryman
 James Wainwright made two appearances as Bill Stillman
 Richard Conte made an appearance as Frank DeLacey in "Trial of a Mafioso"

Episodes

Pilots

Season 1 (1969–70)

Season 2 (1970–71)

Season 3 (1971–72)

Home media
On December 1, 2015, Timeless Media Group released The Bold Ones: The Lawyers- The Complete Series on DVD in Region 1.

Awards and nominations

References

External links
 
 

1968 American television series debuts
1972 American television series endings
1960s American drama television series
1970s American drama television series
1960s American legal television series
1970s American legal television series
Emmy Award-winning programs
English-language television shows
NBC original programming
Television series by Universal Television
Television series created by Roy Huggins